Kirkby Green is a small village in the North Kesteven district of Lincolnshire, England.

Kirkby Green was formerly a civil parish until 1931, when it became part of the parish of Scopwick.

At the eastern end of the village is a level crossing where the road crosses the Peterborough to Lincoln Line, formerly the site of Scopwick and Timberland railway station.

References

External links

Villages in Lincolnshire
North Kesteven District
Former civil parishes in Lincolnshire